Gyrodon tennesseensis is a bolete fungus in the family Paxillaceae. It was originally described in 1940 by Wally Snell and Alexander H. Smith as a species of Boletus. Snell and Hesler transferred it to Gyrodon a year later. It is found in the United States and Canada.

References

External links

Fungi described in 1940
Paxillaceae
Fungi of North America